Subah Be Daagh Hai is a 2014 Pakistani television film produced by Momina Duraid under their banner MD Productions. It stars Yumna Zaidi, Humayun Ashraf and Anum Fayyaz.

Cast
Yumna Zaidi as Ayesha 
Humayun Ashraf as Zain
Anum Fayyaz as Natasha
Shehryar Zaidi as Malik Sahib: Natasha's father
Seema Sehar as Natasha's mother
Kaiser Naqvi as Naani Maa: Ayesha's grandmother

References

2014 films
Pakistani television films
2014 television films